Annemarie Werner-Hansen (21 July 1939 – 11 October 1993) was a Danish sprint canoer who competed in the early to mid-1960s. Competing two Summer Olympics, she earned her best finish of fourth in the K-1 500 m event at Rome in 1960.

References

1939 births
1993 deaths
Canoeists at the 1960 Summer Olympics
Canoeists at the 1964 Summer Olympics
Danish female canoeists
Olympic canoeists of Denmark